Etienne 'Mot' Taljaard (born ) is a South African rugby union player for the  in the Currie Cup and the Rugby Challenge. His regular position is wing.

References

South African rugby union players
Living people
1993 births
Rugby union players from Cape Town
Rugby union wings
Falcons (rugby union) players
Pumas (Currie Cup) players